The Hill of Aldie is an elevated landform in the east of Aberdeenshire, Scotland. Nearby is the prehistoric monument Catto Long Barrow.

See also
Laeca Burn

Line notes

References
 C. Michael Hogan (2008) C. Michael Hogan (2008) Catto Long Barrow fieldnotes, The Modern Antiquarian
 Ordnance Survey of the United Kingdom (2004) Landranger, 1:50,000 scale

Mountains and hills of Aberdeenshire